Jonathan Duncan may refer to:
Jonathan Duncan (Governor of Bombay) (1756–1811)
Jonathan Duncan (swimmer) (born 1982), New Zealand swimmer
Jon Duncan (born 1975), British orienteer
Jonathan Duncan (currency reformer) (1799–1865), British advocate of reforming the monetary system
Jonathan Lincoln Duncan, fictional President of the United States and main character of the novel The President Is Missing (2018) by Bill Clinton and James Patterson

See also
John Duncan (disambiguation)